Semioscopis avellanella is a species of moth of the family Depressariidae. It is found in most of Europe (except most of the Balkan Peninsula and the Iberian Peninsula ) east to the eastern parts of the Palearctic realm.

The wingspan is 20–26 mm. The forewings are rosy-grey whitish, sprinkled with pale fuscous; a dark fuscous streak from base along fold to 1/3, thence bent upwards to disc before middle; second discal stigma forming a dark fuscous angulated mark; some dark fuscous scales tending to form dots on costa and termen; 2 and 3 separate. Hindwings are pale greyish. The larva is whitish-green; dorsal line darker; head and plate of 2 green.

Adults are on wing from March to April.

The larvae feed on Betula, Tilia (including Tilia cordata) and Carpinus species. They feed inside a folded or rolled leaf of their host plant. Pupation takes place in detritus. The species overwinters in the pupal stage.

References

External links
lepiforum.de

Semioscopis
Moths described in 1793
Moths of Europe